is a town located in Akita Prefecture, Japan.

Geography
Mitane is located in northwestern Akita Prefecture, bordered by the Sea of Japan to the west.

Neighboring municipalities
Akita Prefecture
Noshiro
Oga
Hachirōgata
Gojōme
Ōgata
Kamikoani

Climate
Mitane has a Humid continental climate (Köppen climate classification Cfa) with large seasonal temperature differences, with warm to hot (and often humid) summers and cold (sometimes severely cold) winters. Precipitation is significant throughout the year, but is heaviest from August to October.  The average annual temperature in Mitane is 11.1 °C. The average annual rainfall is 1527 mm with September as the wettest month. The temperatures are highest on average in August, at around 25.1 °C, and lowest in January, at around -1.0 °C.

Demographics
Per Japanese census data, the population of Mitane peaked at around the year 1950 and has been in steady decline since then.

History
The area of present-day Mitane was part of ancient Dewa Province, dominated by the Satake clan during the Edo period, who ruled Kubota Domain under the Tokugawa shogunate. The area was organized into towns and villages within Yamamoto District, Akita with the establishment of the modern municipalities system in 1889. The town of Mitane was created on March 20, 2006, by merging the towns of Hachiryū, Koto'oka, and Yamamoto. The town name comes from the Mitane River that flows through the three original towns. After the merger, the town hall was set up in the former Hachiryū town hall, but the center of transportation and economy is the Shikado district of the former Koto'oka town.

Government
Mitane has a mayor-council form of government with a directly elected mayor and a unicameral town council of 15 members. Mitane, together with the city of Noshiro and the other municipalities of Yamamoto District contributes four members to the Akita Prefectural Assembly. In terms of national politics, the town is part of Akita 2nd district of the lower house of the Diet of Japan.

Economy
The economy of Mitane is based on agriculture. The town produces over 90% of the junsai sold commercially in Japan. The center of transportation and economy is the Shikato district in former Kotooka town.

Education
Mitane has five public elementary schools and three public middle schools operated by the town government. The town does not have a high school.

Transportation

Railway
 East Japan Railway Company - Ōu Main Line
 -  -  -

Highway

Noted people from Mitane
Takashi Miura, professional boxer

References

External links

Official Website 

 
Towns in Akita Prefecture
Populated coastal places in Japan